The Boxer and Death is a 1962 Slovak film directed by Peter Solan. The film is based on the life of Polish boxer Tadeusz "Teddy" Pietrzykowski, but in the film the boxer's name is Ján Komínek. It stars Štefan Kvietik and Manfred Krug, and was based on a Polish novel by Jozef Hen.

A Hollywood remake Triumph of the Spirit was directed by Robert M. Young in 1989.

References

External links
 

1962 films
Czechoslovak World War II films
Slovak-language films
Holocaust films
Slovak World War II films